The Canada men's national volleyball team represents Canada in international volleyball competitions. They are overseen by Volleyball Canada, the governing body for volleyball in Canada. The team placed fourth place at the 1984 Olympic Games in Los Angeles and three bronze medals at the Pan American Games in 1979, 1999 and 2015. They have participated in four Olympic Games, including most recently a fifth-place finish at Rio 2016, after returning to the Games following a quarter-century absence. 
Canada hosted the 2015 Pan American Games in Toronto where they beat Puerto Rico for the bronze medal. Canada competed at the FIVB Volleyball Men's World Cup in 2015 for the first time in 12 years, finishing seventh. They last appeared in 2003, also finishing seventh. They finished joint-seventh at the 2014 FIVB Volleyball Men's World Championship.

History

Early years
In 1953, the Canadian Volleyball Association (CVA) was formed, joining FIVB the same year. That year, the first national volleyball championship was held as well. Canada's first appearance at a major international competition was at the 1959 Pan American Games, held in Chicago. Canada finished 6th in the tournament, after finishing 3rd in their group and failing to advance to the final group. In 1968, Canada joined NORCECA, two years after it was formed. They competed in their first NORCECA championship in 1969, finishing 4th.

1970s
In 1973, at their second NORCECA championship, Canada won the bronze medal. A year later, they competed at their first FIVB World Championships, in Mexico. Canada finished last in their group in the first round, losing all three matches in straight sets. In the classification round, they finished 3rd, finishing below both Tunisia and the United States. In the final classification round, Canada finished 2nd in the group, placing them 20th overall in the tournament.

Canada qualified for their first-ever Olympic tournament in 1976 as hosts. They finished bottom of their group in the group stage, losing in straight sets in every match, and ending up in 9th place overall. The next year, Canada appointed Ken Maeda as the head coach, and in the team's first competition under him, they won bronze at the 1977 NORCECA Championship. In 1978, Canada finished 20th out of 24 teams at the World Championships. At the 1979 Pan American games, Canada won bronze, winning five matches while losing two in the tournament.

1980s

At the 1981 NORCECA championship, Canada finished 3rd, beating Mexico in the bronze medal match. The next year, Canada competed in their 3rd FIVB World Championship, held in Argentina. They finished top of their group in the first round, ahead of East Germany and Italy on their set ratio. In the second group round, Canada finished 5th in their group, knocking them out of medal contention and ranking them 11th place in the tournament. The following year at the 1983 NORCECA Championships, they won the silver medal, finishing below the United States.

In 1984, Canada competed at the Olympic Games for the second time in their history. They finished top of their group ahead of Italy and Japan on their set ratio in the group stage, advancing them to their first Olympic semi-final appearance. They met the United States in the semis, losing in straight sets, sending them to the bronze medal match where they lost to Italy again. Their 4th place finish at the tournament stands as their highest ever Olympic finish.

Canada finished 3rd at the NORCECA Championship in 1985 and 1987, and finished 2nd at the 1989 NORCECA Championship while failing to qualify for the 1986 FIVB World Championships.

1990s

Canada competed at the 1990 FIVB World Championships in Brazil, finishing 3rd in their group in the group stage. In the round of 16, Canada lost to France in four sets, sending them to the classification bracket, where they lost in five sets to both Czechoslovakia and Japan. Canada finished the tournament in 12th place. The next year, Canada competed in the FIVB World League for the first time. They finished bottom of their group with 18 points over 16 games and finished the tournament in last place. That same year, Canada hosted the NORCECA Championship for the first time, with the tournament taking place in Regina. Canada finished 3rd in the tournament, and qualified for the 1992 Summer Olympics in Barcelona. At the Olympics, they finished 5th in their group, failing to make it to the quarterfinals and finishing the tournament in last place.

In 1993, Canada finished in 3rd place at the NORCECA Championship, beating Puerto Rico in the bronze medal match. At the 1994 FIVB World Championships, Canada lost out in the round of 16 after finishing 3rd in their group, finishing the tournament tied for 9th place. At both the 1995 and 1997 NORCECA Championships, Canada finished with bronze, beating Puerto Rico and Mexico in both respective bronze medal matches. At the 1998 FIVB World Championship, Canada began the tournament finishing 3rd in their group in the first round. In the second group round, Canada finished 5th in their group, failing to make it to the semi-finals. Canada finished the tournament in 12th place, losing to Ukraine and Argentina in the classification matches.

Canada returned to World League in 1999 for the first time since 1992, finishing in 8th place. At the NORCECA Championship, Canada finished with bronze, beating Mexico in the bronze medal match in five sets. Canada also won bronze in the 1999 Pan American Games in Winnipeg, beating Argentina in their final match.

2000s

In the 2000 World League season, Canada finished in 11th place. The next year, at the 2001 NORCECA Championship, they finished with bronze, beating Dominicana in their final match. At the 2002 FIVB World Championship, Canada finished 3rd in the first group stage but did not advance to the second group round. They finished 17th overall in the tournament. In 2003, Canada finished with a silver medal at the NORCECA Championship, losing to the United States in the final, and in 2005 they finished with a bronze medal in the same tournament. In 2006, Canada competed in the FIVB World Championship held in Japan. They began the tournament finishing 3rd in their group, advancing past the preliminaries to the main round. There, they placed 6th in their group, knocking them out of medal contention. In the classification matches, Canada lost to the United States in 5 sets but beat Puerto Rico in 4 sets to place 11th overall in the competition. The following year, Canada placed 13th in World League, after finishing bottom of their group with two wins in 12 matches. In the 2007 and 2009 editions of the NORCECA Championship, Canada were held off of the podium for the first time since 1975, finishing in 4th place both years.

2010–2016

At the 2010 FIVB World Championship, Canada finished tied for 19th, losing out in the first group round. The following year Canada competed in World League again, placing 12th overall. The same year, Canada won bronze at the NORCECA Championship, beating Puerto Rico in the deciding match. Canada finished 5th overall in the 2013 World League season, and later that year Canada finished with silver in the NORCECA Championship, losing to the United States in the final.

In 2014, Canada competed in the FIVB World Championship in Poland. Canada opened the tournament with a loss in straight sets to Russia before beating Bulgaria in five sets. Canada then went on to beat the remaining teams in the group all in straight sets to claim the second-ranked spot in the group, advancing to the second round. Canada started the second round off well, beating Cuba in 5 sets before defeating Finland in three straight. However, following two straight-set losses to Brazil and Germany, Canada finished fourth in the group and did not advance to the third round. Canada's finished the world championship in 7th place, a record for the national team.

In 2015, Canada hosted the Pan American Games. At the tournament, Canada finished top of their group, advancing to the semifinals. There they faced Argentina, and lost in four sets, sending Canada to the bronze medal match to face Puerto Rico. They were successful and defeated them in four sets, winning Canada's 3rd Pan-American bronze medal.

In the 2016 World League season, Canada finished top of Group 2, advancing to the Final Round. In the Final Round, they beat Turkey in the semifinals in three sets, and defeated Portugal in the final in three straight. This win qualified Canada for Group 1 in the 2017 World League for the first time. Following the successful World League campaign, Canada competed in the Olympic Qualifiers. Canada began the tournament with two five-set losses to Poland and Iran, before beating Australia in five sets. Canada then went on to beat Venezuela before falling to France in straight sets. They then closed out the tournament with back-to-back wins over Japan and China, in four and five sets respectively. This was good enough for a 4th place finish in the tournament, qualifying Canada for their first Olympics in 24 years.

At the 2016 Summer Olympics, Canada started out strongly, beating USA in three straight sets. However, they failed to defeat the host Brazil, falling to them in four sets, while following that match up with a straight-set loss to France in their 3rd group match. In their 4th match, Canada defeated Mexico in four sets, setting up a must-win final group stage match against Italy. Canada beat Italy in four sets, led by Gavin Schmitt's match-high 23 points. This result placed Canada 2nd in their group and set up a quarterfinal matchup against Russia. However, they were unable to advance past the Russians, losing in three straight sets. Canada finished the tournament in 5th place, their highest Olympic finish since 1984.

2017–present

Following Glenn Hoag's retirement as head coach, Stephane Antiga was hired as Hoag's successor. At the 2017 World League, Canada played with a much younger team than was on display at the Olympics the previous year. With the retirements of many leaders within the squad, Antiga looked to younger talent such as Ryley Barnes and Sharone Vernon-Evans to step up and contribute. Canada began their 2017 World League with a strong first week, beating both Belgium and the reigning Olympic Bronze medalists USA in five sets, while losing to Serbia. In week two, Canada won three points against Bulgaria, while losing their other two matches in four sets. In the final week, Canada beat Belgium and Italy, gaining 5 out of a possible 9 points for the week, which was enough for them to finish in 5th place and qualify for the final round.

Canada lost their first match of the final round to the host Brazilians, before defeating the Russians in straight sets, sending Canada to the semi-finals. There they met France and lost in four sets. In the bronze medal match, Canada faced USA, and after losing the first set Canada went on to win three straight and claim their first-ever World League medal. At the conclusion of the tournament, both Graham Vigrass and Blair Bann were selected as tournament all-stars.

Competitive record

Olympic Games
 Champions   Second place   Third place
{|
|valign="top" width=0%|

World Championship
 Champions   Second place   Third place

World Cup
 Champions   Second place   Third place

Nations League
 Champions   Second place   Third place

World League

  1990 Osaka — did not participate
  1991 Milan — 10th place
  1992 Genoa — 7th place
  1993 São Paulo — did not participate
  1994 Milan — did not participate
  1995 Rio de Janeiro — did not participate
  1996 Rotterdam — did not participate
  1997 Moscow — did not participate
  1998 Milan — did not participate
  1999 Mar del Plata — 8th place
  2000 Rotterdam — 11th place
  2001 Katowice — did not participate
  2002 Belo Horizonte — did not participate
  2003 Madrid — did not participate
  2004 Rome — did not participate
  2005 Belgrade — did not participate
  2006 Moscow — did not participate
  2007 Katowice — 13th place¹
 Bernier, Brinkman, Cundy, Cardinal, Davidiuk, Dodds, Duerden, Gaumont Casias, Grapentine, Koskie, Lewis, Mainville, Munday, Toews, Winters, Wolfenden Youngberg. Head coach: Hoag
  2008 Rio de Janeiro — did not participate
  2009 Belgrade — did not participate
  2010 Córdoba — did not participate
  2011 Gdańsk — did not participate
  2012 Sofia — 12th place¹
 Bann, Brinkman, Cundy, Duff, Faucher, Gaumont Casias, Howatson, Kaminski, Lewis, Mainville, McGovern, Perrin, Schmitt, Schneider, Simac, Van Lankvelt, Winters. Head coach: Hoag
  2013 Mar del Plata — 5th place
 Bann, Duff, Howatson, Lewis, Mainville, Perrin, Schmitt, Schneider, Simac, Van Lankvelt, Verhoeff, Vigrass, Winters. Head coach: Hoag
  2014 Florence — 13th place¹
 Blankenau, Derocco, Duff, Hoag, Lewis, Marshall, McGovern, Perrin, Sanders, Schmitt, Schneider, Simac, Soonias, Van Lankvelt, Verhoeff, Vigrass, Winters. Head coach: Hoag
  2015 Rio de Janeiro — 15th place¹
 Bann, Blankenau, Burt, Derocco, Duff, C. Hoag, N. Hoag, Howatson, Lewis, Marshall, Perrin, Sanders, Schmitt, Schneider, Schouten, Simac, Van Berkel, Van Doorn, Van Lankvelt, Verhoeff, Vigrass, Winters. Head coach: Hoag
  2016 Kraków — 13th place
 Bann, Blankenau, Duff, Hoag, Maar, Marshall, Perrin, Sanders, Simac, Van Doorn, Van Lankvelt, Verhoeff, Vigrass, Winters. Head coach: Hoag
  2017 Curitiba —  Bronze medal
 Bann, Barnes, Derocco, Hoag, Maar, Marshall, Perrin, Sanders, Szwarc, Van Berkel, Van Doorn, Vernon-Evans, Vigrass, Walsh. Head coach: Antiga.

¹ players during all matches of intercontinental round

NORCECA Championship

  1969 Mazatenango — 4th place
  1971 Havana — did not qualify
  1973 Tijuana —  Bronze medal
  1975 Los Angeles — 4th place
  1977 Santo Domingo —  Bronze medal
  1979 Havana —  Silver medal
  1981 Mexico City —  Bronze medal
  1983 Indianapolis —  Silver medal
  1985 Santiago —  Bronze medal
  1987 Havana —  Bronze medal
  1989 San Juan —  Silver medal
  1991 Regina —  Bronze medal
  1993 New Orleans —  Bronze medal
  1995 Edmonton —  Bronze medal
  1997 Caguas —  Bronze medal
  1999 Monterrey —  Bronze medal
  2001 Bridgetown —  Bronze medal
  2003 Culiacán —  Silver medal
  2005 Winnipeg —  Bronze medal
  2007 Anaheim — 4th place
  2009 Bayamón — 4th place
  2011 Mayaguez —  Bronze medal
  2013 Langley —  Silver medal
  2015 Córdoba —  Gold medal
 Sanders, Perrin, Lewis, Verhoeff, Duff, Simac, Schneider, Van Lankvelt, Van Doorn, Burt, Winters, Hoag, Bann, Marshall. Head coach: Hoag
  2017 Colorado Springs —  Bronze medal
  2019 Winnipeg —  Bronze medal
  2021 Durango City —  Silver medal

Pan American Games

  1955 Mexico City — did not participate
  1959 Chicago — 6th place
  1963 São Paulo — 8th place
  1967 Winnipeg — 6th place
  1971 Cali — 9th place
  1975 Mexico City — 6th place
  1979 San Juan —  Bronze medal
  1983 Caracas — 5th place
  1987 Indianapolis — 5th place
  1991 Havana — 6th place
  1995 Mar del Plata — 5th place
  1999 Winnipeg —  Bronze medal
  2003 Santo Domingo — 5th place
  2007 Rio de Janeiro — 7th place
 Bernier, Carroll, Cundy, Duerden, Grapentine, Daniel Lewis, Munday, Soonias, Wilcox, Winters, Wolfenden, Youngberg. Head Coach: Hoag
  2011 Guadalajara — 6th place
 Bann, Burt, Halpenny, Kilpatrick, Leiske, Mainville, Miller, Nault, Parkinson, Ratsep, Santoni. Head Coach: Vincent Pichette
  2015 Toronto —  Bronze medal
 Hoag, Lewis, Marshall, Perrin, Sanders, Schmitt, Schneider, Simac, Van Lankvelt, Verhoeff, Vigrass, Winters. Head Coach: Hoag

Pan-American Cup

  2006 Mexicali & Tijuana —  Bronze medal
  2007 Santo Domingo — 4th place
  2008 Winnipeg —  Silver medal
  2009 Chiapas —  Silver medal
  2010 San Juan — 5th place
  2011 Gatineau —  Bronze medal
  2012 Santo Domingo — 6th place
  2013 Mexico City — did not participate
  2014 Tijuana — 7th place
  2015 Reno — 4th place
  2016 Mexico City —  Bronze medal
  2017 Gatineau — 4th place
  2018 Córdoba — 6th place
  2019 Colima City — 7th place
  2021 Santo Domingo —  Silver medal
  2022 Gatineau —  Silver medal

America's Cup

  1998 Mar del Plata — 6th place
  1999 Tampa — 5th place
  2000 São Bernardo — 5th place
  2001 Buenos Aires — 6th place
  2005 São Leopoldo — 5th place
  2007 Manaus — 5th place
  2008 Cuiabá — did not participate

Team
The following is the Canadian roster for the 2022 FIVB Volleyball Men's World Championship.

Head coach:  Benjamin Josephson

Coaching Staff

Coach History

Kit providers
The table below shows the history of kit providers for the Canada national volleyball team.

Sponsorship
Primary sponsors include: main sponsors like Inter Pipeline other sponsors: Lululemon Athletica, Wilson Sporting Goods and UNIGLOBE Travel International.

See also

 Canada men's junior national volleyball team
Canada women's national volleyball team

References

External links
Official website
FIVB profile

Volleyball
National men's volleyball teams
Volleyball in Canada